The "Mingulay Boat Song" is a song written by Sir Hugh S. Roberton (1874–1952) in the 1930s. The melody is described in Roberton's Songs of the Isles as a traditional Gaelic tune, probably titled "Lochaber". The tune was part of an old Gaelic song, "Òran na Comhachaig" (the 'Creag Ghuanach' portion); from Brae Lochaber.  The song describes fishermen sailing homeward to the isle of Mingulay where their families wait.

Lyrics
Roberton's lyrics are as follows:

Alternative lyrics
Later performers have adapted the song via folk process, with alterations to Roberton's lyrics. For example:

The McCalmans sang their own version on the 1973 album An Audience with the McCalmans.

The Corries, among the best known performers of the song, used the following words:

The Longest Johns adapted the lyrics on their album Between Wind And Water:

The Storm Weather Shanty Choir preformed the song on their album A Drop of Nelson's Blood with these lyrics

We are workers at the hawser

We are workers since break of day

We are workers at the hawser

As the sun sets on Mingulay

Chorus

Heel y’ho boys, let her go, boys

Bring her head round into the weather

Heel y’ho boys, let her go boys

Sailing homeward to Mingulay

What care we though white the Minch is

What care we for wind and weather?

Let her go boys, every inch is

Sailing homeward to Mingulay

Chorus

Heel y’ho boys, let her go, boys

Bring her head round into the weather

Heel y’ho boys, let her go boys

Sailing homeward to Mingulay

Wives are waiting by the pier head

or looking seaward from the heather.

Pull her ’round boys, and we’ll anchor

‘ere the sun sets on Mingulay

Chorus

Heel y’ho boys, let her go, boys

Bring her head round into the weather

Heel y’ho boys, let her go boys

Sailing homeward to Mingulay

Ships return now, heavy laden

Mothers holdin’ their bairns a-cryin’

They’ll return though, when the sun sets

They’ll return back to Mingulay

Chorus

Heel y’ho boys, let her go, boys

Bring her head round into the weather

Heel y’ho boys, let her go boys

Sailing homeward to Mingulay

Recordings
The Clancy Brothers and Tommy Makem perform this song on their 1966 album, Isn't It Grand Boys.
Richard Thompson performs this song on the 2006 compilation CD, Rogue's Gallery and on his 2009 live recording, Live Warrior.
Fisherman's Friends perform the song on their 2010 album Port Isaac's Fisherman's Friends.

References

Scottish folk songs
Maritime music
Songs about boats
Songs about fishers